is a Japanese singer from Nagoya who is signed to 5pb. Records. She made her debut in 2016 with the release of her first single "Open your eyes", which was used as the ending theme to the 2016 anime television series Occultic;Nine. Her music has also been featured in the anime series A Centaur's Life and Laid-Back Camp. She made her first U.S. appearance at Anime Boston 2018.

Biography
Asaka was born in Nagoya on October 7, 1999. At the age of three, her family moved to Michigan, where she would stay for five years. While in America, she had become exposed to anime series Crayon Shin-chan and Doraemon, which led her to become interested in anime. After returning to Japan, she initially wanted to move to Tokyo, but instead she moved back to Nagoya. While in Japan, she watched the anime series Inazuma Eleven and The Melancholy of Haruhi Suzumiya; she was inspired by characters singing and playing the guitar in Haruhi Suzumiya, which led her to study about character songs. Although she considered becoming an interpreter because of her knowledge of English, after watching the series Macross Frontier and listening to May'n, the singing voice of the character Sheryl Nome, she decided that she wanted to become an anison singer. At the encouragement of her father, and after listening to the singer Konomi Suzuki, Asaka decided to pursue a career in music. Prior to debuting as a singer, she also appeared at various events as a cosplayer.

Asaka began participating in competitions, winning a singing contest in Chubu in 2014. She later participated in an anison contest sponsored by NHK as the representative of the Chubu region in 2015. Following this, she made her debut as a musician in 2016 with the release of her first single "Open your eyes", the title track of which was used as the ending theme to the 2016 anime television series Occultic;Nine. Her second single "Edelweiss" was released in 2017; the title track is used as the ending theme to the anime series A Centaur's Life. Her third single "Play the game", released in November 2017, was used as the opening theme to the Occultic;Nine visual novel. Her fourth single "Shiny Days" was released on January 24, 2018; the title track is used as the opening theme to the anime series Laid-Back Camp, which aired on January 4, 2018. Asaka also performed the ending theme to the Laid-Back Camp spin-off Heya Camp, titled "The Sunshower" which was released as her seventh single. Her fifth single "Eternal Star" was released on August 15, 2018; the title track is used as the ending theme to the anime series Island. She released a mini-album titled 19Box on January 9, 2019. Her sixth single  was released on April 24, 2019; the title track is used as the opening theme to the anime series YU-NO: A Girl Who Chants Love at the Bound of this World.

In April 2020, it was announced that she would take a one-month hiatus from music activities to recover from vocal chord surgery. She released her eighth single "I believe what you said" on October 14, 2020; the title track is used as the opening theme to the anime series Higurashi: When They Cry – GOU. Her ninth single "Seize the Day" was released on January 27, 2021; the title track is used as the opening theme of the second season of Laid-Back Camp. She released her second album Pontoon on August 11, 2021. Her song "Believe Myself" was used as the opening theme of the 2021 anime series Shikizakura. The song was released as her tenth single on November 10, 2021. Her eleventh single "Ready Set Go!!" was released on January 26, 2022. The title's track was used as the opening theme to the anime series She Professed Herself Pupil of the Wise Man.
Her twelfth single "Sun Is Coming Up" was released on June 29, 2022. The title's track was used as the opening theme to the anime movie Laid-Back Camp. Her thirteenth single  was released on August 10, 2022. The title's track was used as the second opening theme to the anime series Summer Time Rendering.

Discography

Singles

Digital singles

Mini-albums

Albums

Other appearances

References

External links
 Official website 
 

1999 births
Anime musicians
Living people
Musicians from Aichi Prefecture
21st-century Japanese women singers
21st-century Japanese singers